Vintage Aero Flying Museum (VAFM), formally LaFayette1 Escadrille Flying Museum, is Colorado's international aviation museum at Platte Valley Airpark,  northwest of Hudson, Colorado and  northeast of Denver, Colorado.

Andy Parks, son of the last World War I Lafayette Escadrille member who 'flew west', James Parks², maintains the legacy and history of the LaFayette Escadrille pilots. The collection of each of these pilots' original uniforms and memorabilia is on display in custom cabinets in a secured hangar of World War I aircraft. There is no other collection of this magnitude in the world today. The Parks have created a museum in a rural setting, much like a French rural World War I air field.

VAFM is a 501(c)(3) non-profit organization and its foundation was created by James Parks in 1984 as a historical and educational foundation.

Flying aircraft on display
 1917 Fokker Dr.I (replica) 
 1918 Fokker D.VII
 1918 Fokker D.VIII
 1917 Sopwith Pup 
 1917 SE5a
 1939 Vultee BT-13 Valiant
 Mullicoupe by Younkin/Dake (Mulicoupe is a combination of a Monocoupe 90 and a MrMulligan)

See also
Museums
 CAF Rocky Mountain Wing Museum, Grand Junction, CO
 Colorado Aviation Historical Society Old Lowry AFB Campus, Denver, CO
 Peterson Air and Space Museum Peterson AFB, Colorado Springs, CO
 Pueblo Historical Aircraft Society Pueblo Airport, Pueblo, CO
 Pueblo Weisbrod Aircraft Museum Pueblo Airport, Pueblo, CO
 Spirit of Flight Center Lafayette, CO
 Wings Over the Rockies Air and Space Museum Old Lowry AFB Campus, Denver, CO
Lists
 List of airport museums in the United States
 List of American Aero Squadrons

References

Footnotes
 1History behind the capital "F" in LaFayette:

There are two different usages of Lafayette and LaFayette. The capital F comes from the French spelling as written on the French Air Corp certificates as presented to each flyer of the Escadrille. The LaFayette Foundation decided to use the capital F in many of their documents and writings. Other authors and the general public will use the small F for their writings and general reference to L.E. The French General, LaFayette was the origin name when the French Air Corp renamed the Americana Escadrille to LaFayette Escadrille in honor of General LaFayette who helped General George Washington in the American Revolution.
 ²In 1983 during this late L.E. reunion that the surviving members of the Corps made Dr. James Parks an Honorary Member #9 of the Corp.

External links

 Lafayette Pilots' Memorial
 History of the Escadrille
 New England Air Museum's Lafayette Escadrille Online Exhibit
 Motivations of the Lafayette Escadrille Pilots by Guy Nasuti

Aerospace museums in Colorado
Military and war museums in Colorado
Museums in Weld County, Colorado
World War I museums in the United States